Stenoma argospora is a moth of the family Depressariidae. It is found in French Guiana and Guyana.

The wingspan is 15–16 mm. The forewings are dark fuscous, with a slight purplish tinge and some small scattered irregular dots of white scales on the median third of the wing in the cell and a very faint curved subterminal series of small darker spots, and a marginal streak around the apex. The hindwings are blackish, in males with scattered hairscales.

References

Moths described in 1915
Taxa named by Edward Meyrick
Stenoma